Promyshlenny City District is the name of several city divisions in Russia. The name literally means "industrial".
Promyshlenny City District, Orenburg, a city district of Orenburg, the administrative center of Orenburg Oblast
Promyshlenny City District, Samara, an administrative and municipal city district of Samara, the administrative center of Samara Oblast
Promyshlenny City District, Smolensk, a city district of Smolensk, the administrative center of Smolensk Oblast
Promyshlenny City District, Stavropol, a city district of Stavropol, the administrative center of Stavropol Krai
Promyshlenny City District, Vladikavkaz, a city district of Vladikavkaz, the capital of the Republic of North Ossetia–Alania

See also
Promyshlenny (disambiguation)
Industrialny City District (disambiguation)

References